Anoectochilus setaceus, the bristly anoectochilus, is a species of orchid native to the island of Java and Sumatra in Indonesia.

References

External links 

setaceus
Plants described in 1825
Orchids of Java
Orchids of Sumatra